The 1920 United States Senate election in North Dakota took place on November 2, 1920. Incumbent Senator Republican Senator Asle Gronna ran for re-election to a third term. However, he was narrowly defeated in the Republican primary by Edwin F. Ladd, the President of the North Dakota Agricultural College, who had been endorsed by the Nonpartisan League. In the general election, Ladd was opposed by H. H. Perry, the Democratic nominee and a Democratic National Committeeman. As Republican presidential nominee Warren G. Harding overwhelmingly won North Dakota over Democratic nominee James M. Cox, Ladd also staked out a wide victory—though his margin of victory was not as large as Harding's.

Democratic Primary

Candidates
 H. H. Perry, Democratic National Committeeman

Results

Republican Primary

Candidates
 Edwin F. Ladd, President of the North Dakota Agricultural College, former State Chemist and Food Commissioner
 Asle Gronna, incumbent U.S. Senator
 Frank White

Results

General election

Results

References

North Dakota
1920
1920 North Dakota elections